Phallothrips is a genus of thrips in the family Phlaeothripidae, and consists of a single species, Phallothrips houstoni. It was first described in 1992 by Laurence Mound and Bernard Crespi.

Phallothrips houstoni is found in New South Wales, Queensland, and Western Australia.

References

External links 

 Lucid key: Australian Thrips Genera: Phallothrips (description)

Phlaeothripidae
Thrips
Thrips genera
Taxa named by Laurence Alfred Mound
Taxa named by Bernard Crespi
Insects described in 1992